Adam Dlouhý (born 29 November 1994) is a Czech professional ice hockey player. He is currently playing for HC Benátky nad Jizerou of the Chance Liga, on loan from HC Bílí Tygři Liberec of the Czech Extraliga.

Dlouhý made his Czech Extraliga debut playing with HC Bílí Tygři Liberec during the 2014–15 Czech Extraliga season.

References

External links

1994 births
Living people
HC Benátky nad Jizerou players
HC Bílí Tygři Liberec players
Czech ice hockey forwards
Piráti Chomutov players
Sportspeople from Liberec